Rokometni klub Prevent Slovenj Gradec or simply RK Prevent was a team handball club from Slovenj Gradec, Slovenia.

Club honours
Slovenian Championship:
Runners-up (3): 1996–97, 1997–98, 1998–99

Slovenian Cup:
Runners-up (2): 1993–94, 2003–04

References

External links
EHF profile

Slovenian handball clubs
Slovenj Gradec
Handball clubs established in 1954
1954 establishments in Slovenia